Bugsted is a transmedia entertainment brand created by Vodka Capital, Televisa Consumer Products
and Ánima Estudios.  The property includes mini-series of videos (13 episodes), video games and related toys.

Miniseries

Plot
Bugsted was an ordinary bug that was accidentally taken to the moon with the Apollo 11 mission, and then left behind when the astronauts left.  Hidden away on the dark side of the moon, Bugsted developed a unique survival mechanism: spontaneous cloning.  Each new challenge Bugsted faced resulted in a new clone to handle the situation.  Before long, the dark side of the moon was inhabited by a whole community of Bugsteds.

In September 2012, a space probe collecting moon samples accidentally brought a Bugsted back to Earth. That stressful, unexpected journey trapped in the space module triggered his defense mechanism, leading to the arrival of hundreds of Bugsteds on our planet. Stranded on Earth, they make it their mission to return to the Moon.

Technical features  

 Format: 13 episodes of 60–90 seconds each
 Genre: Comedy
 Target: 8–12 years
 Technique: 2D and 3D CGI

Characters 
The main characters of the series are Uab get the back to the moon and Skills Vertigo, Montana, Emo, Jummpa, Panzer, Bommba, Juanito, Mole, Bubble, Missile, Tornado, Sharky and Quaka. They can't live without each other but they also can't help being selfish and playing pranks on each other constantly. The different phases of the moon change their personality for better or worse. These three friends don't speak but they can communicate through noises, gestures and actions.

 Emo: At the moon he was a party animal but when he got to the earth and discovered the twilight saga, he became totally fascinated with the emo universe, and he turned into a very introspective guy. He's the smartest and that's why he's the leader even if he is not looking for it.
 Vertigo: She's madly in love with Emo, though he doesn't return her feelings. She faints every time he touches her.
 Montana: This Bugsted is the ultimate looker. He can bulldoze obstacles with his quarterback skills.

Episodes

Spin-off film
Announced at MipTV, a feature film spin-off is reportedly in development.

References

External links

 .

Mass media companies of Spain
Mexican children's animated comedy television series
Spanish children's animated comedy television series
2010s animated television series
2013 Mexican television series debuts
Computer-animated television series
Toy companies of Spain
Ánima Estudios television series